Jocqueius is a genus of ground beetles in the family Carabidae. This genus has a single species, Jocqueius malawicus. It is found in Malawi.

References

Platyninae